

616001–616100 

|-bgcolor=#f2f2f2
| colspan=4 align=center | 
|}

616101–616200 

|-bgcolor=#f2f2f2
| colspan=4 align=center | 
|}

616201–616300 

|-bgcolor=#f2f2f2
| colspan=4 align=center | 
|}

616301–616400 

|-bgcolor=#f2f2f2
| colspan=4 align=center | 
|}

616401–616500 

|-bgcolor=#f2f2f2
| colspan=4 align=center | 
|}

616501–616600 

|-bgcolor=#f2f2f2
| colspan=4 align=center | 
|}

616601–616700 

|-id=688
| 616688 Gaowei ||  || Gao Wei (born 1982), a Chinese amateur astronomer from Nong'an County and member of the Xingming Observatory Sky Survey team. He has discovered novae in the Andromeda and Triangulum Galaxy, as well as supernovae and minor planets. || 
|-id=689
| 616689 Yihangyiyang ||  || Sun Yihang (born 2014) and Sun Yiyang (born 2017) are the sons of Chinese amateur astronomer Sun Guoyou who co-discovered this minor planet. || 
|}

616701–616800 

|-bgcolor=#f2f2f2
| colspan=4 align=center | 
|}

616801–616900 

|-bgcolor=#f2f2f2
| colspan=4 align=center | 
|}

616901–617000 

|-bgcolor=#f2f2f2
| colspan=4 align=center | 
|}

References 

616001-617000